The 2011 J.League Division 2 season was the 40th season of the second-tier club football in Japan and the 13th season since the establishment of J2 League. The season began on March 5 and finished on December 3. Due to the aftermath of the 2011 Tōhoku earthquake and tsunami, the season was put on hold from March 12 to April 23.

FC Tokyo won the tournament and returned to J1 immediately after unfortunate relegation that happened last season. By virtue of winning the 2011 Emperor's Cup final, they earned a berth in the 2012 AFC Champions League as well. Sagan Tosu and Consadole Sapporo finished second and third, respectively, and also won the promotion. Consadole are returning to the top flight after three years of absence, while for Tosu this is the first promotion in their history.

Sagan became the last of original ten J2 teams to reach J1, passing the inglorious moniker of the longest-staying D2 dweller to Mito HollyHock.

Teams
As in the previous seasons, the size of the league was increased by one team to twenty overall. Gainare Tottori as 2010 Japan Football League champions were promoted.

Kashiwa Reysol as champions of the 2010 season, runners-up Ventforet Kofu and third-placed team Avispa Fukuoka were promoted to the 2011 J.League Division 1. Kashiwa made their immediate return to the top division, while Kofu and Fukuoka ended three- and four-year tenures in the J2. The three teams were replaced by FC Tokyo, Kyoto Sanga FC and Shonan Bellmare, who were relegated at the end of the 2010 J.League Division 1 season after finishing in the bottom three places of the table. Shonan only made a cameo appearance at the D1, Kyoto re-entered the second level of the Japanese league pyramid after three years, and Tokyo eventually had to return to the J2 for the first time after eleven seasons.

League table

Results

Top scorers

Attendance

References 

J2 League seasons
2
Japan
Japan